Skæring is a suburb of Aarhus in Denmark. It is situated some 10 km. north-east of Aarhus C and is one of the wealthier suburbs. Skæring Parish had a population of 4977 as of (2006) of which 4.402 were members of the Church of Denmark. Skæring is known for good beaches, the marina Kaløvig Bådelaug and the former military shooting range Skæring Hede which is today a public park and memorial for five resistance fighters who were executed there during the Second World War. 
In addition, 2 movies have been filmed in Skæring. 

Neighborhoods of Aarhus